The Giardino Montano Linasia (9,000 m2) is a nature preserve and botanical garden located at 720 meters altitude near Monte Linas in San Benedetto, Iglesias, Province of Carbonia-Iglesias, Sardinia, Italy. Opening days depend on the time of year; an admission fee is charged.

The garden was established in 1989 by the Ente Foreste della Sardegna, and realized in 1992 in collaboration with the Istituto di Botanica dell'Università di Cagliari. It is organized into four major sections as follows: open areas; wooded areas; riparian vegetation; and endemic plant collection. Plants are labeled with scientific names and geographic origins.

Species
The garden contains roughly 60 species of endemic plants, as well as some 20 species of nonnative introductions. 

Endemic species include: 
 
 Allium parciflorum
 Aquilegia nugorensis
 Arenaria balearica
 Armeria sulcitana
 Arum pictum
 Barbarea rupicola
 Bellium bellidioides
 Bellium crassifolium
 Borago pygmaea
 Bryonia marmorata
 Carlina macrocephala
 Centaurea filiformis
 Crocus minimus
 Cymbalaria aequitriloba
 Delphinium pictum
 Euphorbia cupanii
 Euphorbia hyberna
 Galium schmidii
 Genista aetnensis
 Genista corsica
 Genista morisii
 Genista valsecchiae
 Glechoma sardoa
 Helichrysum montelinasanum
 Helleborus argutifolius
 Hypericoum hircinum
 Iberis integerrima
 Limonium merxmuelleri
 Linaria arcusangeli
 Mentha insularis
 Mentha requienii
 Morisia monantha
 Ophrys chestermanii
 Ophrys morisii
 Orchis mascula
 Ornithogalum corsicum
 Pancratium illyricum
 Plagius flosculosus
 Plantago subulata
 Polygonum scoparium
 Psoralea morisiana
 Ptilostemon casabonae
 Rhamnus persicifolius
 Ribes sandalioticum
 Salvia desoleana
 Saxifraga cervicornis
 Saxifraga corsica
 Santolina insularis
 Seseli bocconii
 Scorzonera callosa
 Scrophularia trifoliata
 Sesleria insularis
 Soleirolia soleirolii
 Stachys glutinosa
 Stachys corsica
 Teucrium subspinosum
 Thymus herba
 Vinca sardoa
 Viola corsica

See also 
 List of botanical gardens in Italy

References 
 Giardino Montano Linasia
 Musei Provincia Cagliari entry (Italian)
 Guida al Giardino Montano Linasia e alle Foreste Demaniali di Marganai, Montimannu e Gutturu Pala-Pubusinu, Azienda Foreste Demaniali della Regione Sarda, Servizio Amm.ne Cagliari, 1995.

Botanical gardens in Italy
Gardens in Sardinia